Sergio José Hirane Sarkis (born 27 January 1955) is a Chilean humourist, political commentarist and economist.

From 2021 to 2022, he had a talk show in La Red.

References

External links
 Official Website

1955 births
Living people
Chilean people
Chilean people of Palestinian descent
Chilean politicians
Pontifical Catholic University of Chile alumni
Adolfo Ibáñez University alumni
Chilean television personalities
Chilean political commentators